Events in the year 1942 in China.

Incumbents
President: Lin Sen
Premier: Chiang Kai-shek
Vice Premier: Kung Hsiang-hsi

Events
 Beginning of the Chinese famine of 1942-43
April 26 - a gas and coal dust explosion in the Benxihu Colliery killed 1,549 miners.
mid May-early September - Zhejiang-Jiangxi Campaign
 A cholera epidemic in Yunnan province kills around 200 people

Births
 December 21 - Hu Jintao
 Chen Jialin
 Huang Baosheng
 Wang Zhizhen
 He Xiangjian
 Chen Guidi
 Huang Zhiquan

Deaths 
Zhao Shangzhi
May 27 - Chen Duxiu

See also
 List of Chinese films of the 1940s

References

 
Years of the 20th century in China